Badalte Rishton Ki Dastaan is an Indian television drama series which premiered on 18 March 2013 on Zee TV. The series is a Hindi version of Zee Bangla's show Khela, and is produced by Ravi Ojha. The show was first aired on 18 March 2013.

Overview 
Badalte Rishton Ki Dastaan translates to "a tale of fickle relationships". It is the story of relationships and the fight against patriarchal society.  The majority of the series occurs within the spacious Asthana family home.  Balraj Asthana, as the patriarch of the family, believes he can control the behavior of those in the house.  However, each member of the family carries several secrets that they hide from each other.

Balraj's elder brother, Kailash, died mysteriously years earlier.  His widow, Aloka, and their three children live in the house: Akhil, Agasthya, and Deepika.  Akhil is a dutiful officer of the law, whose wife Shyama also carries secrets.  Together they have a daughter, Rimi.

Balraj, as well, is presented as a widower.  He has three living children.  The three daughters are Pallavi, Nupur, and Anuja.  Pallavi defied her father's wishes and married a writer named Niranjan.  He often seems to have a soft heart and soft mind, but a deep and clever character lies beneath.

Aniruddh Asthana married Nandini, whose father formerly owned the house in which the Asthana family now lives.  Balraj deeply loved his son, but was infuriated that the marriage had not yet produced any children.

Holding the house together is Beeji.  She was taken in by the Asthana family when Balraj and Kailash were still children, and promised their family that she would take care of them.  When Balraj's wife Uma never returned from hospital, Beeji raised the children as her own.

The family is thrown into mourning when Ani suddenly dies in a tragic car accident.  Shortly thereafter, his lover Meera arrives at the Asthana house, unaware that Ani was married.

When Balraj discovers that Meera is pregnant with Ani's child, he concocts a scheme to ensure that an heir is produced to inherit Balraj's estate.  As the series progresses, it is revealed that Meera's family is intertwined with the Asthanas in ways that could reveal Balraj's deepest secrets.

Cast 
 Sanjeeda Sheikh - Meera Khandpal-Anuridh's lover and his child's mother.
 Additi Gupta - Nandini Tiwari / Asthana / Kashyap-Anirudh's wife.
 Bhaumik Sampat - Dr. Neel
 Kiran Karmarkar - Balraj Asthana-Anuridh's father.
 Abhinav Shukla - Aniruddh Balraj Asthana / Ani-Nandini's husband and Meera's lover. (Dead)
 Tanushree Kaushal - Aloka Kailash Asthana / Taiji / Ammaji
 Namrata Thapa - Pallavi
 Richa Soni- Shyama Akhil Asthana / Bijli
 Mona Ambegaonkar - Beeji-Anuridh's mother.
 Chaitanya Choudhury - Akhil Kailash Asthana-Anuridh's step brother and Agasthya's elder brother.
 Abhaas Mehta - Agasthya Kailash Asthana-Anuridh's step brother and Agasthya's younger brother.
 Rishi Khurana - Niranjan
 Shalu Shreya - Anuja
 Ragini Khanna as Ragini

References

External links 
 Official Website

Indian drama television series
Zee TV original programming
Hindi-language television shows
Television shows set in Delhi
Indian television soap operas
2013 Indian television series debuts
2013 Indian television series endings